Elliott is an unincorporated community and census-designated place (CDP) in Dorchester County, Maryland, United States. The population was 52 at the 2010 census.

Geography
Elliott is located in southern Dorchester County on Elliott Island, on the east side of Fishing Bay.

Demographics

References

Census-designated places in Dorchester County, Maryland
Census-designated places in Maryland
Maryland populated places on the Chesapeake Bay